Robert Seith (born 9 March 1932) is a Scottish former football player and manager. He won league championships in both England and Scotland, with Burnley and Dundee respectively.

Playing career
Seith began his professional career with Burnley, whom he joined in 1948 aged 16. He made his debut for the Clarets in 1953, in a 2–1 away victory against Manchester United, and soon became their regular right half. By 1959–60 Burnley had become a genuine title challenger and Seith played 27 games in that league campaign as they moved towards their first championship since 1920–21. However a defensive blip in a game against challengers Wolves saw him dropped in March 1960 and he was still absent from the side when they eventually clinched the title.

That summer, a dispute with the Burnley chairman led to Seith's transfer back to Scotland, where he joined Dundee for £7,500. The Dens Park side contained famous names such as Alan Gilzean, Gordon Smith and Ian Ure and was a potent threat to the traditional dominance of the Old Firm, eventually winning the League title in the 1961–62 season. This allowed Seith the opportunity to compete in the European Cup which had been denied him by his acrimonious departure from Turf Moor and he featured prominently in the Dark Blues run to the semi-final, where they eventually lost to eventual winners A.C. Milan.

Coaching career
Seith retired from playing in 1964, joining the Dundee coaching staff before moving to a similar role with Rangers; he was to resign from his Rangers post in protest at the sacking of manager Scot Symon in 1967. He earned his first opportunity as a manager when appointed to replace Jimmy Milne at Preston North End but left in 1970. He had a brief period in charge of the Scottish national youth team before being hired as manager of Heart of Midlothian. It was Seith who brought striker Drew Busby to Tynecastle. The Maroons had endured several seasons of mediocrity prior to Seith's appointment but gradually improved under his charge and in the 1973–74 season topped the League for several months following a 13-match unbeaten run. An inconsistent finish saw them narrowly miss out on European qualification though and following a 10 games winless streak at the beginning of 1974–75, he was dismissed.

Seith left the football business following his departure from Tynecastle and has since worked as a chiropodist, based in Broughty Ferry. He was belatedly awarded a medal for his efforts in Burnley's 1959–60 league title win in 1999, having been denied one at the time due a dispute with the then club chairman. He was presented with this medal in a public ceremony prior to a Burnley home match in October 1999.

References

External links
Profile at claretsmad.co.uk
Profile/Interview at dundeemad.co.uk

1932 births
Footballers from Coatbridge
Scottish footballers
Dundee F.C. players
Burnley F.C. players
Scottish football managers
Preston North End F.C. managers
Heart of Midlothian F.C. managers
Dundee F.C. non-playing staff
Rangers F.C. non-playing staff
Living people
Scottish Football League representative players
Association football wing halves
English Football League players
Scottish Football League players
English Football League managers
Scottish Football League managers